NGC 1337 is an unbarred spiral galaxy in the Eridanus constellation. It was discovered by British astronomer Lewis Swift on 10 November 1885.

References

Astronomical objects discovered in 1885
Unbarred spiral galaxies
1337
Discoveries by Lewis Swift
Eridanus (constellation)
012916